Hurricane Humberto was a moderately powerful hurricane that briefly affected Bermuda in September 2001. It was the eighth named storm of the season, as well as the fourth hurricane. It formed on September 21 between Puerto Rico and Bermuda, partially related to previous Hurricane Gabrielle. After weakening and believed to be on the verge of dissipating, Humberto unexpectedly restrengthened to the southeast of Atlantic Canada. The intensification was short-lived and the storm dissipated on September 27. There were a series of significant observational flights into the hurricane that produced a wealth of data on the structure of hurricanes.

Meteorological history

Hurricane Humberto originated from a trough that extended southwestward from Hurricane Gabrielle, which had previously moved across Florida into the western Atlantic Ocean. The trough interacted with an upper-level low, resulting in an increase of convection, or thunderstorms, in the region. A surface low developed on September 19, and it gradually organized as it moved westward. After deep convection developed over the center, it is estimated the system reached tropical depression strength on September 21, about halfway between Puerto Rico and Bermuda. The National Hurricane Center (NHC) first published an advisory on the storm at 11 AM EDT, identifying it as Tropical Depression Ten. Upon its formation, the depression moved northwestward toward a break in the mid-level ridge. On satellite imagery, the depression looked well-organized, with banding features, outflow, and convection, although Hurricane Hunters had difficulty locating a closed center of circulation. The unfavorable conditions were from the upper-level low to its southwest, which was producing wind shear over the storm; nevertheless, the NHC anticipated strengthening.

On September 22, the surface circulation rapidly became better organized, and based on confirmation from the Hurricane Hunters, the NHC upgraded the depression to Tropical Storm Humberto. Throughout its life, the storm was smaller than average, and as it moved around the subtropical ridge, it gradually intensified. Tropical Storm Humberto developed an eye feature on September 23. At that time, the NHC expected Humberto to continue weakening due to the shear, as well as steadily decreasing water temperatures.

Unexpectedly, the weakening trend stopped, as the steering winds came from the same direction behind the hurricane. It slowed down slightly, and on September 26 the eye of the hurricane became much more distinct. Just as quickly it strengthened, the hurricane began weakening again. The eye became distorted as the convection became asymmetrical, due to the cooler waters and stronger westerlies. Initially, the NHC forecast Humberto to become extratropical. The cloud pattern became increasingly elongated and removed from the center, and late on the 27th, the circulation of Humberto degenerated into an open trough in the far northern Atlantic Ocean. The remnants were expected to be absorbed quickly by a larger extratropical storm to its north.

There were three major aircraft flights into the hurricane over a three-day period which, according to NASA, "were the most comprehensive measurements of the structure of the hurricane ever recorded." The flights were designed to obtain data for better hurricane forecasting.

Impact and naming
Prior to its passage by Bermuda, the National Hurricane Center advised the residents "should monitor the progress of Humberto until it is safely past." On September 23 when the hurricane passed the island, the hurricane-force winds extended  from the center, while tropical storm force winds only extended  from the center. During its passage, the island also recorded  of rainfall.

Only two ships recorded tropical storm-force winds, both of which were away from the center. Some higher surf was recorded along the New Jersey coastline. In September 2001, two men sought to break the record for sailing the quickest time from New York City to Melbourne, Australia; Humberto disrupted their early path slightly, but they ultimately broke the record by 28 hours. Later in its path, there were several marine warnings issued for offshore Newfoundland, although no severe weather affected coastal Atlantic Canada. Overall, there were no reports of casualties or damage from the hurricane.

See also

 Other storms of the same name
List of Bermuda hurricanes
Hurricane Humberto (2019), a hurricane with the same name that also affected Bermuda

References

2001 Atlantic hurricane season
Hurricanes in Bermuda
Category 2 Atlantic hurricanes
Humberto